Laika is a graphic novel by Nick Abadzis that gives a fictionalized account of the life and death of the eponymous dog, the first living creature launched in orbital spaceflight.

Based on a true story, the graphic novel tells the story of Laika from multiple points of view: from that of the ambitious Sergey Korolyov, Chief Engineer responsible for the launching and construction of Sputnik 2; to that of Yelena Dubrovsky, official trainer of the space-bound dogs; to that of Oleg Gazenko, scientist; and finally from the viewpoint of Laika herself, who had lived as a stray on the streets of Moscow.

Characters

Historical
Laika/Kudryavka
Nikita Sergeyevich Khrushchev (1894-1971) - Premier of the Soviet Union (1953-1964)
Sergei Pavolovich Korolev (1907-1966)  - the "Chief Designer of Rockets"; head of the Special Design Bureau 1 (OKB-1)
Vasily Pavlovich Mishin (1917-2001) - Deputy Chief Designer of OKB-1
Boris Evseyevich Chertok (1912-2011) - Head of Control Systems of the Special Design Bureau 1 (OKB-1)
Academician Anatoli Arkadyevich Blagonravov (1894-1975) - Academician and Soviet space scientist; Chair of the State Commission Overseeing Biological Launches
Dr. Vasily Vasilevich Parin (1903–1971) -  Head of Physiology in the Institute of Therapy, USSR Academy of Medical Sciences
Dr. Alexandr Dmitrievich Seryapin (1918–2009) -  Biophysicist, Scientific Research Institute of Aviation Medicine
Air Force Lieutenant Colonel Dr. Vladimir Ivanovich Yazdovsky (1913-1999) - Soviet space medicine scientist; head of the Biomedical Medicine Group at IBMP
Air Force Captain Dr. Oleg Georgievich Gazenko (1918-2007) - Soviet space medicine scientist at IBMP

Fictional
Tatiana - a maid; briefly adopted Laika
Liliana - Tatiana's daughter
Katya Korovina - Tatiana's cousin
Mikhail Korovin - Laika's second owner, an ill-mannered boy. 
Mr. Korovin - Mikhail's father
Gertruda - A stray; befriends Laika.
Viktor and his wife - grocery-stall owners in a Moscow market
Yelena Alexandrovna Dubrovsky - Head of IBMP department for canine training and handling

Theme
Abadzis notes that his intention was to avoid anthropomorphism in portraying the central canine character. Thus Laika's traits of trust and eagerness to please are portrayed through her non-verbalised behaviour, and the reactions of the more sympathetic humans with whom she comes in contact. Mistreated as a young dog, Laika shows a need to gain human affection and approval that leads her through a harsh training regime to death in space. Even the empathetic Yelena accepts that animals will die in the space programme, though bitterly regretting that her "special dog" is the one to be sent with no hope of survival. Many of the incidents portrayed by Abadzis, such as Laika being taken home by a senior officer to play with his children shortly before the launch, are recorded as having actually occurred.

The graphic novel concludes with a real-life statement of regret by Oleg Gazenko, made in 1998: "Work with animals is a source of suffering to all of us. We treat them like babies who cannot speak. The more time passes, the more I'm sorry about it. We did not learn enough from the mission to justify the death of the dog".

Reception
Laika was well-received, with the New York Press writing that Abadzis "has fashioned a poignant and accurate portrait of the lives Laika touched in the three years leading up to Sputnik II’s launch. His characters — including the dog — are as real as the story he’s telling: animated with complex personalities, flaws, humor and emotion."  The Space Review called it "an entertaining but also educational overview of the life of an unwitting space pioneer", while another review states that "reading Laika is the sort of experience that you won’t forget any time soon".

Awards

 2008:
 Won for "Best Publication for Teens" Eisner Award
 Nominated for "Best Reality-Based Work" Eisner Award
 2008 Young Adult Library Services Association "Top Ten Great Graphic Novels for Teens"

References

External links
Author's site on Laika

Reviews
Publishers Weekly
Kirkus, Publishers Weekly, and other trade journals
The Observer
School Library Journal
Boing Boing
Comics Bulletin

British graphic novels
2007 comics debuts
Non-fiction graphic novels
Eisner Award winners
Comics about dogs
Comics based on real people
Comics set in Russia
Moscow in fiction
Comics set in the 1950s
British historical novels
Cultural depictions of Nikita Khrushchev
First Second Books books